Kahibah, an electoral district of the Legislative Assembly in the Australian state of New South Wales, has had three incarnations, the first from 1894 to 1920, the second from 1927 to 1930 and the third from 1950 to 1971.


Election results

Elections in the 1960s

1968

1965

1962

Elections in the 1950s

1959

1957 by-election

1956

1953 by-election

1953

1950

1930 - 1950

Elections in the 1920s

1927

1920 - 1927

Elections in the 1910s

1917

1913

1910

Elections in the 1900s

1907

1904

1901

Elections in the 1890s

1898

1895

1894

References

New South Wales state electoral results by district